SolarStratos is an aeronautical project aimed at flying a solar-powered airplane for the first time to the stratosphere. The SolarStratos airplane is equipped with solar cells but is not able to fly directly on solar power, thus is accurately described as a battery powered electric airplane that is equipped with solar cells; it is planned to be the first manned solar-equipped aircraft to enter the stratosphere.

Objectives 
SolarStratos is a project officially initiated in March 2014 by Raphaël Domjan. It is a two-seater solar plane built by Calin Gologan with which he and his team plan to achieve an altitude record.

This eco-exploration aims to demonstrate that renewable energies make it possible to go beyond what is possible with conventional modes of propulsion. Ultimately, and after the record flight planned for 2018, Raphaël Domjan and the SolarStratos team wish to commercialize the technologies developed during the stratospheric mission, in particular by developing stratospheric solar drones.

Specifications (SolarStratos)

Project stages
2012-2013: Constitution of the team and first feasibility study
March 17, 2014 : Official launch of the SolarStratos project
2014-2015: Finalization of the design and start of construction of the aircraft
Dec. 7, 2016 : Presentation of the SolarStratos aircraft
2017: First flight on May 5, 2017 at Payerne, test flights and preparation for the record flight
From 2018: Test flights
On July 6, 2018, the aircraft's left wing broke during a stress test carried out on ground.
From 2020: Record flight
After the project: Development of stratospheric solar passenger airplanes or telecommunication relay solar drones

Funding
SolarStratos budget is around 10 million Swiss francs (9.25 million euros).

Team

Operational team
About fifteen people work on the SolarStratos project. The CEO of SolarStratos is Swiss entrepreneur Roland Loos. Its president is the eco-explorer Raphaël Domjan, also the main pilot and intended to perform the record altitude flight. The mission's flight director is the Spanish American astronaut Michael López-Alegría. Damian Hischier takes on the role of test pilot of the prototype plane and the Swiss Thierry Plojoux is the second pilot. Alexis Domjan, brother of Raphaël Domjan, is responsible for all telecommunication and IT aspects of the project.

Sponsors
Sponsors include Jean Verne, great-grandson of Jules Verne, Edgar Mitchell, moon walker Apollo 14 (1930-2016), Marie-Vincente Latécoère, founding president of the PG Foundation Latécoère, Jacques Rougerie, oceanographer architect, Jean-François Clervoy, ESA astronaut, André Schneider, vice- President of Resources and Infrastructures of the EPFL, Mirosław Hermaszewski, Polish astronaut, Manfred Dutch von Ehrenfried, author of Stratonauts: Pioneers Venturing into the Stratosphere, and even Chuck Leavell, keyboardist of Rolling Stones and co-founder of the Mother Nature Network.

See also
 Solar Impulse
 Sunseeker Duo
 Solar Challenger
 Solair
 Electric aircraft

References

External links 
 official website

Solar-powered aircraft
Swiss experimental aircraft
Solar power in Switzerland
Electric aircraft
Aircraft first flown in 2017